Moses ben Jacob Cordovero ( Moshe Kordovero ‎; 1522–1570) was a central figure in the historical development of Kabbalah, leader of a mystical school in 16th-century Safed, Ottoman Syria. He is known by the acronym the Ramak.

After the Medieval flourishing of Kabbalah, centered on the Zohar, attempts were made to give a complete intellectual system to its theology, such as by Meir ibn Gabbai. Influenced by the earlier success of Jewish philosophy in articulating a rational study of Jewish thought, Moshe Cordovero produced the first full integration of the previous differing schools in Kabbalistic interpretation. While he was a mystic inspired by the opaque imagery of the Zohar, Cordoverian Kabbalah utilised the conceptual framework of evolving cause and effect from the Infinite to the Finite in systemising Kabbalah, the method of philosophical style discourse he held most effective in describing a process that reflects sequential logic and coherence. His encyclopedic works became a central stage in the development of Kabbalah.

Immediately after him in Safed, Isaac Luria articulated a subsequent system of Kabbalistic theology, with new supra-rational doctrines recasting previous Kabbalistic thought. While Lurianism displaced the Cordoverian scheme and became predominant in Judaism, its followers read Cordoverian works in harmony with their teachings. Where to them, Lurianism described the "World" of Rectification, Cordovero described the pre-Rectification World. Both articulations of the 16th century mystical Renaissance in Safed gave Kabbalah an intellectual prominence to rival Medieval Rationalism, whose social influence on Judaism had waned after the Expulsion from Spain.

Biography

Early life
The name Cordovero indicates that his family originated in Córdoba, Spain and perhaps fled from there during the expulsion of 1492 ensuing from the Spanish Inquisition. His Hebrew signature, however (Cordoeiro), strongly suggests a long-lasting residence in Portugal.

The Ramak was either born in, or moved to Safed in the Land of Israel, the city that was soon to become famed as a center of Kabbalah and mystical creativity. Albeit not involved in mystical studies until his twentieth year, 
Ramak soon after gained a reputation of an extraordinary genius and a prolific writer. Besides his knowledge in Kabbalah, he was a Talmudic scholar and a man of commanding mastery in Jewish philosophical thought who was respected in these fields. Contrary to popular belief, however, Ramak was not one of the rabbis who received the special semicha ("ordination") from Rabbi Jacob Berab in 1538, alongside Rabbi Yosef Karo (Cordovero's teacher in Halakha), Rabbi Moshe of Trani, Rabbi Yosef Sagis, and Rabbi Moshe Alshich. As a whole, Ramak's contributions to posterity were in speculative and performative Kabbalah, but during his lifetime he was the renowned head of the Yeshiva for Portuguese immigrants in Safed.

Scholarship
According to his own testimony in the introduction to "Pardes Rimonim", in 1542, at the age of twenty, Ramak heard a "Heavenly voice" urging him to study Kabbalah with his brother-in-law, Rabbi Shlomo Alkabetz, composer of the mystical song Lecha Dodi. He was thus initiated into the mysteries of the Zohar. The young Ramak not only mastered the text, but decided to organize the Kabbalistic themes leading to his day and present them in an organized fashion. This led to the composition of his first book, Pardes Rimonim ("Orchard of Pomegranates"), which was completed in 1548 and secured Ramak's reputation as a brilliant Kabbalist and a lucid thinker. The Pardes, as it is known, was a systemization of all Kabbalistic thought up to that time and featured the author's attempt at a reconciliation of various early schools with the conceptual teachings of the Zohar in order to demonstrate an essential unity and self-consistent philosophical basis of Kabbalah.

His second work - a magnum opus titled Ohr Yakar ("Precious Light") - was a 16 volume commentary on the Zoharic literature in its entirety and a work to which Ramak had devoted most of his life (the modern publication of this great work has started during the mid 1960s and reached partial fruition in 2004 Jerusalem, though the 23-volume set left out about two-thirds of the Tikkunei Zohar; additional volumes are still being published). Some parts of Ohr Yakar have been published under separate titles, such as Shiur Qomah, Tefilah le-Moshe etc.

Some other books for which the Ramak is known are Tomer Devorah ("Palm Tree of Deborah"), in which he utilizes the Kabbalistic concepts of the Sephirot ("Divine attributes") to illuminate a system of morals and ethics; Ohr Neerav, a justification of and insistence upon the importance of Kabbalah study and an introduction to the methods explicated in Pardes Rimonim; Elimah Rabbati, a highly abstract treatise on kabbalistic concerns revolving around the Godhead and His relationship to the Sefirot; and Sefer Gerushin, a short and intimate composition which features the highly devotional slant of Ramak, as well as his asceticism and religious piety. Certain parts of Ramak's works are still in form of manuscripts, whereas his existing writings suggest many other compositions which he either intended to write or had actually written - but were lost.

Disciples
Around 1550, the Ramak founded a Kabbalah academy in Safed (then in Ottoman Syria), which he led for twenty or so years, until his death. According to Jewish legend, it was reported that the prophet Elijah revealed himself to him. Among his disciples were many of the luminaries of Safed, including Rabbi Eliyahu de Vidas, author of Reshit Chochmah ("Beginning of Wisdom"), and Rabbi Chaim Vital, who later became the official recorder and disseminator of the teachings of Rabbi Isaac Luria.

Ramak was survived by a wife whose name remains unknown (it is known that she was Solomon Alkabetz' sister) and by a son named Gedaliah (1562–1625). Gedaliah was the impetus behind the publication of some of Ramak's books in Venice, Italy c. 1584–7. Gedaliah was buried in Jerusalem, where he had spent most of his adult life after returning from Venice.

Succession of Kabbalistic interpretation after the Ramak
According to tradition, Isaac Luria (known by the acronym "Ari" or "Arizal") arrived in Safed on the exact day of the funeral of Moshe Cordovero in 1570. When he joined in the funeral procession, he realised that only he saw a pillar of fire following the Ramak's presence. The Zohar describes this spiritual revelation as a sign to the individual who sees it, that he is meant to inherit the succession of leadership from the departed person. However, as Luria had been instructed to find his chosen disciple in Safed, Haim Vital, to reveal his new teachings to, he avoided accepting Kabbalistic leadership until six months later, when Rabbi Haim Vital approached him. The Ari only lived for two years after this, until 1572, but in those few months he revolutionised the conceptual system of Kabbalah, with his new doctrines and philosophical system.

The two schools of Cordoveran and Lurianic Kabbalah give two alternative accounts and synthesis of the complete theology of Kabbalah until then, based on their interpretation of the Zohar. After the public dissemination of the Zohar in Medieval times, various attempts were made to give a complete intellectual system of theology to its different schools and interpretations. Influenced by the earlier rational success of Jewish philosophy, especially the work of Maimonides, in producing a systematic intellectual articulation of Judaism, the Ramak achieved the first accepted systemisation of Kabbalah, based on its rational categorisation and study. Subsequent followers of the Ari saw their teachings as harmonious with, and a deeper interpretation of the Zohar and the Ramak's system, but the new system of Isaac Luria revealed completely new doctrines, as well as new descriptions of the earlier ideas of Kabbalah. In time, Lurianic Kabbalah emerged as the dominant system; however, the works of the Ramak are still highly esteemed and widely studied, as well.

Among the Ramak's most visible books
 Pardes Rimonim ("An Orchard of Pomegranates") - Ramak's first book, an encyclopedic synthesis of the main trends of kabbalistic thought with numerous diagrams, which secured his reputation as a mystical genius.
 Ohr Yakar ("A Precious Light") - a Magnum opus of some 16 volumes in its extant manuscript form, which had occupied Ramak throughout his adult life - a classic commentary on the Zohar, Sefer Yetzirah and the Zoharic literary offshoots. Its publication ended around 2005 in Jerusalem (some 22 volumes). Certain parts, such as Tefilah le-Moshe and Shiur Qomah, were previously published as separate works.
Tomer Devorah ("Palm tree [of] Deborah") - a popular work of Musar Literature based on kabbalistic principles. It was translated into English by Louis Jacobs as "Moses Cordovero, The Palm Tree of Deborah", New York Sepher-Hermon Press, 1960,  BJ1287.C8T61J2; and later by Rabbi Moshe Miller (1993). First chapter was also translated with an extensive commentary by Henry Abramson under the title The Kabbalah of Forgiveness: The Thirteen Levels of Mercy in Rabbi Moshe Cordovero's Date Palm of Devorah (Tomer Devorah) (2014)
 Eilima Rabbati - of which 2/3 is still unpublished.
 Ohr Neerav ("A Pleasant Light" - can also mean "A Mixed Light" or "A Darkened 
Light") - translated to English and annotated by Ira Robinson (1994).
 Sefer Gerushin ("The Book of Banishments") - a disclosure of Ramak's fellowship and their devotional piety in the Galilean outskirts of Safed. A highly informative text concerning Ramak's devotional piety and the use of landscape as the negotiator between heaven and earth.

Teachings on meditation
The Ramak taught that when meditating, one does not focus on the Sefirot (Divine emanations) per se, but rather on the light from the Infinite ("Atzmut"-essence of God) contained within the emanations. Keeping in mind that all reaches up to the Infinite, his prayer is "to Him, not to His attributes."  Proper meditation focuses upon how the Godhead acts through specific sefirot. In meditation on the essential Hebrew name of God, represented by the four letter Tetragrammaton, this corresponds to meditating on the Hebrew vowels which are seen as reflecting the light from the Infinite-Atzmut.

The essential name of God in the Hebrew Bible, the four letter Tetragrammaton (Yud- Hei- Vav-Hei), corresponds in Kabbalistic thought to the 10 sefirot. Kabbalists interpret the shapes and spiritual forces of each of these 4 letters, as reflecting each sefirah (The Yud-male point represents the infinite dimensionless flash of Wisdom, and the transcendent thorn atop it, the supra-conscious soul of Crown. The first Hei-female vessel represents the expansion of the insight of Wisdom in the breadth and depth of Understanding. The Vav-male point drawn downward in a line represents the birth of the emotional sefirot, Kindness to Foundation from their pregnant state in Understanding. The second Hei-female vessel represents the revelation of the previous sefirot in the action of Kingship). Therefore, the Tetragrammaton has the Infinite Light clothed within it as the sefirot. This is indicated by the change in the vowel-points (nekudot) found underneath each of the four letters of the Name in each sefira. " Each sefira is distinguished by the manner in which the Infinite Light is clothed within it". In Jewish tradition, the vowel points and pronunciation of the Tetragrammaton are uncertain, and in reverence to the holiness of the name, this name for God is never read. In Kabbalah many spiritual permutations of different vowel notations are recorded for the Tetragrammaton, corresponding to different spiritual meanings and emanations.

* Kubutz and Shuruk are pronounced indistinguishably in modern Hebrew and for this reason there is reason to be skeptical as far as the association of Kubutz with Hod rather than Yesod and vice versa.

Burial place
He is buried in Old Cemetery of Tzfat / Safed.

Other notable rabbis also buried in Old Cemetery of Tzfat / Safed:
 Ari HaKadosh
 Alshich HaKadosh
 Shlomo Halevi Alkabetz
 Joseph Karo

Notes

External links
 Rabbi Moshe Cordovero
 Tomer Devorah (The Palm Tree of Deborah) - Cordovero's classic text
 Moses Cordovero's Meditations for the Ten Days of Repentance
 The Ramak
 Jewish Encyclopedia article
 "The Unity of God" - from The Garden of Pomegranates
 Video Lecture on Rabbi Moshe Cordevero by Henry Abramson of Touro College South
 Translation of First Chapter of Tomer Devorah excepted from Henry Abramson's The Kabbalah of Forgiveness.

1522 births
1570 deaths
Rabbis from Córdoba, Spain
16th-century rabbis from the Ottoman Empire
Rabbis in Ottoman Galilee
Kabbalists
Rabbis in Safed
Sephardi rabbis in Ottoman Palestine
Authors of Kabbalistic works
Burials at the Old Jewish Cemetery, Safed
Hebrew-language writers